Washington Township is one of twelve townships in Rush County, Indiana. As of the 2010 census, its population was 475 and it contained 201 housing units.

History
The Hall-Crull Octagonal House was listed on the National Register of Historic Places in 1984.

Geography

Unincorporated towns
 Raleigh at 
(This list is based on USGS data and may include former settlements.)

References

External links
 Indiana Township Association
 United Township Association of Indiana

Townships in Rush County, Indiana
Townships in Indiana